Gordon Clifford Grant (March 2, 1866 – July 22, 1928) was a Canadian politician. He served in the Legislative Assembly of New Brunswick as member of the Conservative party representing York County from 1925 to 1928.

References

20th-century Canadian politicians
1866 births
1928 deaths
Progressive Conservative Party of New Brunswick MLAs